Dominique Nohain (8 July 1925 – 30 May 2017) was a French actor, dramatist, screenwriter and theatre director. He was the son of Jean Nohain and thus cousin with Jean-Claude Dauphin.

Biography 

In 1944, he joined the Leclerc Division and took part in the Liberation of Paris with his father.

He began a career as an actor in cinema and theater and also appeared in some of his father's shows. With André Leclerc and Pierre Louis, he was the co-writer of the famous 36 chandelles television variety show of the 1950s. He later became a playwright and directed the Théâtre Tristan-Bernard.

Filmography 
Cinema
 1944 : Bifur 3 by Maurice Cam
 1945 : Les Démons de l'aube by Yves Allégret : Simon dit Chouchou
 1946 : Mensonges by Jean Stelli
 1946 : Amour, Délices et Orgues by André Berthomieu (plus adaptation) : Étienne
 1948 : Le Bal des pompiers by André Berthomieu
 1957 : C'est arrivé à 36 chandelles by Henri Diamant-Berger : himself

Television
 1976 :  : Seul le poisson rouge est au courant by Jean Barbier and Dominique Nohain, mise-en-scene Dominique Nohain, directed by Pierre Sabbagh, théâtre Édouard VII
 1979 : Au théâtre ce soir : Crime à la clef by Alain Bernier and Roger Maridat, mise-en-scène Jean-Paul Cisife, directed by Pierre Sabbagh, Théâtre Marigny
 1979 : Au théâtre ce soir : Le Troisième Témoin by Dominique Nohain, mise-en-scène by the author, directed by Pierre Sabbagh, Théâtre Marigny
 1980 : Au théâtre ce soir : Comédie pour un meurtre by Jean-Jacques Bricaire and Maurice Lasaygues, mise-en-scène Dominique Nohain, directed by Pierre Sabbagh, Théâtre Marigny

Theatre

Author 
 Le Troisième témoin
 L'Oiseau de bonheur
 Seul le poisson rouge est au courant (co author : Jean Barbier)
 L'Escargot écossais

Actor 
 1952 : Défense de doubler by Dominique Nohain, directed by Émile Dars - Théâtre Les Célestins, Lyon
 1957 : Auguste by Raymond Castans, directed by Jean Wall, Théâtre des Nouveautés
 1961 : Deux pieds dans la tombe by Frédéric Valmain after Jack Lee, directed by Jean Dejoux - Théâtre Charles de Rochefort
 1961 : Coralie et Cie by Maurice Hennequin and Albin Valabrègue, directed by Jean Le Poulain - Théâtre Sarah-Bernhardt
 1964 : Le Troisième Témoin by Dominique Nohain, mise-en-scène by the author - Théâtre Charles de Rochefort
 1965 : L'Oiseau du bonheur by Dominique Nohain, mise-en-scène by the author - Théâtre de l'Ambigu-Comique
 1973 : Seul le poisson rouge est au courant by Dominique Nohain and Jean Barbier, directed by Dominique Nohain - Théâtre Charles de Rochefort
 1974 : L'Escargot écossais by Dominique Nohain, directed by the author - Théâtre Charles de Rochefort
 1978 : Crime à la clef by Alain Bernier and Roger Maridat, directed by Jean-Paul Cisife - Théâtre Tristan-Bernard
 1979 : Comédie pour un meurtre by Jean-Jacques Bricaire and Maurice Lasaygues, directed by Dominique Nohain - Théâtre Tristan-Bernard

Theatre director 
 1964 : Le Troisième Témoin by Dominique Nohain - Théâtre Charles de Rochefort
 1977 : L'Oiseau du bonheur by Dominique Nohain - Théâtre Tristan-Bernard
 1979 : Comédie pour un meurtre by Jean-Jacques Bricaire and Maurice Lasaygues - Théâtre Tristan-Bernard
 1983 : Erreur judiciaire by Maurice Blum - Théâtre Tristan-Bernard
 1983 : Balle de match by Alain Bernier and Roger Maridat - Théâtre Tristan-Bernard

References

External links 
 Dominique Nohain on data.bnf.fr
 
 Fiche sur Les Archives du spectacle

1925 births
2017 deaths
20th-century French male actors
20th-century French dramatists and playwrights
French male film actors
French male television actors
Male actors from Paris